The Greyfriars Bobby Fountain is a granite fountain in Edinburgh, surmounted by a bronze life-size statue of Greyfriars Bobby, a Skye Terrier who became known in 19th-century Edinburgh for supposedly spending 14 years guarding the grave of his owner John Gray until the dog itself died on 14 January 1872.

The memorial was commissioned by Lady Burdett-Coutts, president of the Ladies Committee of the RSPCA, shortly before the dog died, and the bronze statue was made from life by William Brodie.  At the time, Brodie was making statues of characters from Walter Scott's Waverley novels for the Scott Monument in Princes Street.

Bronze plaques are mounted on the column. The fountain was originally furnished with two bronze drinking cups which were attached to the column by a chain. The supply of water to the fountain was discontinued in 1957, and the monument suffered from neglect until it was restored in 1985.

The memorial was sited at the southern end of George IV Bridge, just past its junction Chambers Street and close to the junction with Candlemaker Row, near the Greyfriars Kirkyard and the National Museum of Scotland.  It was unveiled on 15 November 1873.

The monument became a category A listed building in 1977.  It is reputed to be Edinburgh's smallest listed building.

The statue's nose has recently been a popular feature for tourists, believing that it brings "luck" if rubbed. Edinburgh Council discourages this as it causes damage to the A listed structure, and locals have campaigned to stop the recent "tradition".

References
Notes

Bibliography
 
 Greyfriars Bobby, Edinburgh Museums and Galleries
 Greyfriars Bobby, Historic UK
 Greyfriars Bobby, victorianweb.org

Category A listed buildings in Edinburgh
1873 sculptures
Greyfriars Bobby
Dog monuments
Outdoor sculptures in Scotland
Sculptures of dogs in the United Kingdom
Bronze sculptures in Scotland
Granite sculptures
Animal sculptures in the United Kingdom